Parliamentary elections were held in Finland between 1 and 3 July 1933. The Social Democratic Party remained the largest party in Parliament with 78 of the 200 seats. However, Prime Minister Toivo Mikael Kivimäki of the National Progressive Party continued in office after the elections, supported by Pehr Evind Svinhufvud and quietly by most Agrarians and Social Democrats. They considered Kivimäki's right-wing government a lesser evil than political instability (various short-lived governments) or an attempt by the radical right to gain power. Voter turnout was 62.2%.

Background
The main campaign issues were the differing attitudes towards democracy and the rule of law between the Patriotic Electoral Alliance (National Coalitioners and Patriotic People's Movement) and the Legality Front (Social Democrats, Agrarians, Swedish People's Party and Progressives). The Patriotic Electoral Alliance favoured continuing the search for suspected Communists - the Communist Party and its affiliated organizations had been outlawed in 1930 as treasonous organizations - and was against the Social Democrats' joining the government under any circumstances.  The Legality Front did not want to spend any significant time on searching suspected Communists, but rather wanted to concentrate on keeping the far right in check.  The Lapua Movement had been outlawed after its failed Mäntsälä rebellion in March 1932, and the Patriotic People's Movement had been established as its successor later in 1932. President Svinhufvud (National Coalition) strictly guarded law and order, an attitude which made him somewhat suspicious of the Patriotic People's Movement's motives. Prime Minister Kivimäki (Progressive) led a right-wing minority government, which President Svinhufvud fully supported in the effort to fight the Great Depression.  Despite the Patriotic Electoral Alliance's vigorous election campaign, only about one-sixth of the participating Finnish voters supported it.

Results

References

General elections in Finland
Finland
Parliament
Finland
Election and referendum articles with incomplete results